University of Petroșani is a university located in Petroșani, Hunedoara County, Romania. This university was established in 1948. The college offers both undergraduate and post-graduate courses.

References

External links 
 

Universities in Romania
Educational institutions established in 1948
Education in Petroșani
1948 establishments in Romania